Tanfield Valley, also referred to as Nanook, is an archaeological site located on the southernmost projection of Baffin Island in the Canadian territory of Nunavut. It is possible that the site was known to Pre-Columbian Norse explorers from Greenland and Iceland. It may be in the region of Helluland, spoken of in the Icelandic sagas (Greenland Saga and Saga of Erik the Red).

The Helluland Archaeology Project is a research initiative that was set up at the Canadian Museum of Civilization, now the Canadian Museum of History, to investigate the possibility of an extended Norse presence on Baffin Island with trading with the indigenous Dorset people. It is now on hiatus following Patricia Sutherland's ouster from the museum in 2012. Excavations led by Sutherland at Tanfield Valley found possible evidence of medieval Norse textiles, metallurgy and other items of European-related technologies.  Wooden artifacts from Dorset sites include specimens which bear a close resemblance to Norse artifacts from Greenland. Pelts from Eurasian rats have also been discovered.

However, the eight sod buildings and artifacts found in the 1960s at L'Anse aux Meadows, located on the northern tip of Newfoundland, remains the only confirmed Norse site in North America outside of those found in Greenland.

Moreau Maxwell (1918–1998), professor and curator of Anthropology at Michigan State University, had previously researched the site in his study of the prehistory of Baffin island, the findings of which were summarized in his publication Prehistory of the Eastern Arctic (1985).

References

Further reading
Maxwell, Moreau  (1985) Prehistory of the Eastern Arctic (Academic Press)  
Sutherland, Patricia (2015) The Helluland Archaeological Project (archive.org)

11th century in North America
Archaeological sites in Nunavut
Baffin Island
European medieval architecture in North America
Ruins in Canada
Saga locations
Viking Age in Canada